Milionia rawakensis is a species of moth in the family Geometridae first described by Jean René Constant Quoy and Joseph Paul Gaimard in 1825. It is found in New Guinea.

References 

Ennominae
Moths described in 1825
Moths of New Guinea